Washington County Jail or variations may refer to:

in the United States
(by state)
Washington County Jail (Fayetteville, Arkansas), listed on the NRHP in Arkansas
Washington County Jail and Sheriff's Residence (Washington, Kansas), listed on the NRHP in Kansas
Washington County Jail and Sheriff's Residence (Salem, Indiana), listed on the NRHP in Indiana
Washington County Jail (Maine), Machias, listed on the NRHP in Maine
Washington County Jail (Oregon), formerly listed on the NRHP in Oregon, was located in Hillsboro, has been moved, is now in a museum
Washington County Jail (Washington, Pennsylvania), listed on the NRHP in Pennsylvania
Washington County Jail, Utah (properly, the Purgatory Correctional Facility)